This a list of waterfalls in the Indian state of Karnataka.

References 

 
K